Mirosław Kubisztal (born 12 February 1962 in Tarnów, Poland), is a Polish former professional footballer who played as a forward for Unia Tarnów, KS Cracovia, GKS Katowice (Poland), and Örebro SK (Sweden), where he played 161 matches and scored 68 goals. During his spell in Örebro, Kubisztal became very popular and known as Kuba which led to the Örebro SK fan club being named Kubanerna after him. He twice won the Polish Cup with GKS Katowice. He played one match for Poland national football team, no goal scored.

References

External links
 
 About Kubisztal on Örebro SK homepage

1963 births
Living people
Sportspeople from Katowice
Association football forwards
Polish footballers
Poland international footballers
Ekstraklasa players
Allsvenskan players
Unia Tarnów players
GKS Katowice players
MKS Cracovia (football) players
Örebro SK players
Polish expatriate footballers
Expatriate footballers in Sweden